Michel Fugain (born 12 May 1942) is a French singer and composer. He was born in Grenoble, Isère. He started composing after quitting medical school, and became a solo artist releasing his first album, Je n'aurai pas le temps, in 1967.  The title track was later recorded in English by John Rowles as "If I Only Had Time". He formed a troupe of singers and dancers named Le Big Bazar in 1972, and had some successes including the hit song "Une belle histoire", and was involved in projects including the soundtrack for the film Un jour, la fête. He also had successes as a solo act, toured extensively and made regular appearances in radio and television shows dedicated to chanson and popular music between 1988 and 2002. His career went into a hiatus after the death of his daughter, but he resumed his career in 2005, and launched the project Pluribus in 2013.

Discography

Albums
 Je n'aurai pas le temps (I won't have time, 1967) 
 Les fleurs de mandarine (Mandarin flowers, 1967)
 Une belle histoire (A beautiful story, 1972)
 Fais comme l'oiseau (Do it like the bird, 1972)
 Attention Mesdames et Messieurs (Attention, ladies and gentlemen, 1972)
 Chante (Sing, 1973)
 Jusqu'à demain peut-être (Until tomorrow maybe, 1973)
 La fête (The celebration, 1973)
 Bravo Monsieur le Monde (Bravo, mister World, 1973)
 Tout va changer (Everything is going to change, 1973)
 Les gentils, les méchants (Good people, bad people, 1973)
 Les Acadiens (The Acadians, 1975)
 Ring et Ding (Ring and ding, 1976)
 Le chiffon rouge (The red rag, 1977)
 Des rêves et du vent (Dreams and wind, 1988)
 Viva La Vida (Spanish title which means Live life, 1988)
 Où s'en vont (Where do they go, 1989)
 Petites fêtes entre amis (1996)
 De l'air! (1998)
 Encore (2001)
 Attention mesdames et messieurs... (2005)
 Bravo et merci! (2007)
 Projet pluribus (2013)

Greatest hits
 Fais Comme L'Oiseau - 1972
 C'est pas de l'amour mais c'est tout comme - 2012 No. 72 CAN
 L'essentiel (2002) 
 C'est pas de l'amour mais c'est tout comme (2005)	
 Platinum Collection (2008)
 Hit Collection (2009)
 Michel Fugain, Les années Big Bazar (2013) No. 54 FR

Singles
 "C'est que je t'aime" (1966)
 "Tu peux compter sur moi" (1966)
 "Un moral d'acier" (1967)
 "Daisy" (1967)
 "Les fleurs de mandarine"	Festival (1968)
 "Je n'aurai pas le temps"  (1968)
 "Il tempo che ho non basterà"  (1968)
 "C'est pas ma faute"  (1969)
 "Le temps met longtemps"  (1969)
 "Balade en Bugatti"  (1970)
 "Le temps de ma chanson"  (1971)
 "Les rues de la grande ville"  (1971)
 "Une belle histoire" (& Le Big Bazar)  (1972)
 "Fais comme l'oiseau" (& Le Big Bazar)  (1972)
 "Chante... comme si tu devais mourir demain" (& Le Big Bazar)  (1973)
 "Als ginge morgen Deine Welt zugrund'" (& Le Big Bazar)  (1973)
 "La fête"  (et le Big Bazar)  (1974)
 "Les acadiens" (et le Big Bazar) (1975)
 "Le printemps" (et le Big Bazar)  (1976)
 "Ring et ding"  (et le Big Bazar) (1976)
 "Vis ta vie" (et le Big Bazar) (1976)
 "Le chiffon rouge" (avec la Compagnie Michel Fugain) (1977)
 "Papa"  (et sa Compagnie) (1978)
 "La vieille dame"  (1978)
 "Bonjour nostalgie"  (1979)
 "Loulou"  (1979)
 "Les ailes dans le dos"  (1979)
 "Le cœur au sud" (1984)
 "La fille de Rockefeller"  (1985)
 "Viva la vida"  (1986)
 "Des rêves et du vent"  (1987)
 "Librement"  (1988)
 "Les années guitare"  (1989)
 "Où s'en vont..."  (1989)
 "Chaque jour de plus"  (1989)
 "Comme une histoire d'amour" (& Véronique Genest)  (1990)
 "Alia soûza (& Véronique Sanson)	WEA	(1995)
 "2000 ans et un jour" (1998)
 "Encore" (2000)

Source

Bibliography
Des rires et une larme (Paris, 2007)

References

External links 
  Michel Fugain's official Web site
 "Une Belle Histoire" by Michel Fugain played on chromatic harmonica
 Biography of Michel Fugain, from Radio France Internationale

1942 births
Living people
Musicians from Grenoble
French male singers
Columbia Records artists
Universal Records artists